The Roslyn Water District is a public water utility district in Nassau County, on Long Island, in New York, United States.

History 
The Roslyn Water District was established in 1910.

Communities served 
The Roslyn Water District serves the following communities:

 Albertson (part, with the Albertson Water District)
 East Hills (part, with Jericho Water District)
 Flower Hill (part, with the Manhasset–Lakeville Water District and the Port Washington Water District)
 Greenvale (part, with the Jericho Water District)
 North Hills (part, with the Albertson Water District, the Garden City Park Water District, and the Manhasset–Lakeville Water District)
 Old Westbury (part, with the Village of Old Westbury's water system)
 Port Washington (part, with Port Washington Water District)
 Roslyn
 Roslyn Estates
 Roslyn Harbor (part, with the Glenwood Water District and the Jericho Water District)
 Roslyn Heights (part, with the Albertson Water District)

The Roslyn Water District also sells the Glenwood Water District with its water (as that district lacks its own wells), along with some water to the Albertson Water District.

Statistics 

 Number of wells: 8
 Service area: approximately 
 Pipe network length: approximately

Interconnections 
The Roslyn Water District has 10 interconnections with neighboring districts.

References

External links 

 Official website
Roslyn, New York
 Water supply infrastructure in the United States